The Dubai route numbering system is a network of highways and roads in Dubai, United Arab Emirates that is managed by the Roads and Transport Authority (RTA). The network comprises 6 main highways and several major and minor inter-city and intra-city roads.

Routes

E-routes

Highways connecting Dubai to other emirates are designated Emirates routes or E-routes. They are identified by an emblem of a falcon, the letter E and a two or three digit number.  While within city limits, most roads and highways take alternate names, but are consistently identified by their corresponding E-route number. Six E-routes pass through Dubai, connecting the city with other emirates and towns:

 E 11 (Sheikh Khalifa bin Zayed International Rd, Sheikh Maktoum Bin Rashid Rd, Sheikh Zayed Rd, Sheikh Rashid Rd, Al Ittihad Rd, Dubai - Sharjah Rd, Wasit Street, Wahda Street, Sheikh Mohammed bin Salem Rd, Al Rams Road )
 E 311(Sheikh Mohammed Bin Zayed  Road)
 E 44 (Al Khail Road; Dubai-Hatta Road Hatta Highway)
 E 66 ( Oud Metha Rd, Dubai-Al Ain Road)
 E 77 (Expo Road/Lehbab Road)
 E 611(Emirates Road (old name - Bypass))
 E 55 (Sheikh Zayed Road) (Goes to Adh Dhayd)
 E 22 (Khalifa Ibn Zayed Street; goes to Al Khaznah)
 E 13 (Madinat Zayed (Al Dhafra Region)-Gayathi)
 E 45 (Tarif-Liwa (Mezaira'ah))
 E 15 (Arada-Gayathi adjoining to E11 Abu Dhabi-Ghuweifat Highway)
 E 30 (Abu Dhabi - Al Ain Road; parallel to E 22 Road)

The longest of the E-routes is E 11, which extends the length of the UAE's Persian Gulf coast and connects all emirates, with the exception of Al Fujairah.

D-routes

D-routes connect localities within the city of Dubai and are identified by the emblem of a fort, the letter D and a two or three digit number.  Considerably shorter in length than the average E-route, D-routes provide an intra-city network of roads and streets.  D-routes parallel to UAE's coast along the Persian Gulf are numbered evenly, beginning with D 94; the numbers decrease as the network moves farther from the coast.  D-routes perpendicular to the Persian Gulf coast are odd numbered and increase as the network moves towards the emirate of Sharjah. Some of the D-routes include:
 D 591 (Gardens Boulevard;Ibn Battuta St)
 D 97 (Amman Street)
 D 96 (To Deira Islands)
 D 95 (Al Mamzar Road (Cairo Street); Baghdad Street)
 D 94 (Jumeirah Road, King Salman Bin Abdulaziz Al Saud Street)
 D 93 (Al Wuheida Road; Al Nahda Road; Tunis Street)
 D 92 (Al Wasl Road; Al Mina Road; Al Khaleej Road)
 D 91 (Abu Hail Road, Al Quds St)
 D 90 (Al Satwa Road; Mankhool Road; Al Muasallah Road)
 D 89 (Al Maktoum Road; Airport Road; Al Khawaneej Road)
 D 88 (On Bur Dubai side Sheikh Khalifa Bin Zayed Road and on Deira side Omar Bin Al Khattab Road)
 D 86 (First Al Khail Street/ Al Mustaqabal Street)
 D 85 (Baniyas Road)
 D 84 (Al Seef Road; Zaa'beel Road)
 D 83 (Al Rebat Street/ Tripoli St)
 D 82 (Al Naif Road; Al Rasheed Road)
 D 81 (Riyadh Street)
 D 80 (Salahuddin Road)
 D 79 (Khalid bin al Waleed Road, Oud Metha Road)
 D 78 (Abu Baker Al Siddique Road, Umm Hurair Road, Tariq bin Ziyad Road)
 D 77 (Al Kuwait Street in Bur Dubai and Al Manama Street in Dubai International City)
 D 75 (Sheikh Rashid Road)
 D 73 (2nd December st, 2nd Zaa'beel st)
 D 72 (Al Asayel Street)
 D 71 (Al Safa Street, Financial Center St)
 D 70 (Casablanca Road)
 D 69 (Al Hadiqa Street; Al Meydan Street)
 D 68 (Al Khail Street (parallel to E44 (Al Khail Rd)
 D 67 (Umm Al Sheif Street, Latifa bin Hamdan St (Links E11 to E44))
 D 65 (Al Manara St, Al Marbea' St)
 D 64 (Al Qusais Road; Damascus Street)
 D 63 (Umm Suqeim Street, Al Qudra St)
 D 61 (Hessa Street)
 D 62 (Nadd Al Hammar Road, Beirut St)
 D 60 (Al Rashidiya Road)
 D 59 (Garn Al Sabkha Street)
 D 57 (Al Yalayis Street)
 D 56 (Algeria Street)
 D 55 (Jabal Ali Freezone Street)
 D 54 (Sheikh  Zayed bin Hamdan Al Nahyan Road)
 D 53 (Al Maktoum Airport Street)
 D 50 (Al Amardi Street)
 D 42 (Saih Al Salam Street)
 D 40 (Margham Street)
 D 30 (In Hatta, Dubai. Name Unknown)

Major roads 

Major roads typically surround a community or locality within the city and are addressed by a name and a three digit identification number. Streets within a locality are identified with a two digit number. Street numbers are repeated within each locality.

References

See also
 List of roads in Dubai

Route numbering system
Route numbering system

Route numbering system